The June 2010 Northern Plains tornado outbreak was one of the most prolific summer tornado outbreaks in the Northern Great Plains of the United States on record. The outbreak began on June 16th, with several tornadoes in South Dakota and Montana. The most intense storms took place the following day across much of eastern North Dakota and much of Minnesota. The system produced 93 tornadoes reported across four states while killing three people in Minnesota. Four of the tornadoes were rated as EF4 on the Enhanced Fujita scale, the most violent tornadoes in a 24-hour period since there were five within 15 hours in the 2008 Super Tuesday tornado outbreak. This was the region's first major tornado outbreak of the year and one of the largest on record in the region, comparable to a similar outbreak in June 1992. The 48 tornadoes that touched down in Minnesota on June 17 marked the most active single day in the state's history. June 17 was the second largest tornado day on record in the meteorological summer, behind the most prolific day of the 2003 South Dakota tornado outbreak on June 24, 2003.

Synopsis
On June 16, 2010, an upper-level area of low pressure and associated trough moved southeastward across the Rocky Mountains into the Great Plains. Along the base of the trough, the presence of a strong mid-level jet stream provided significant instability; however, warm-air aloft was expected to limit the extent of convective development. In light of this, the Storm Prediction Center issued a slight-risk of severe weather for portions of Colorado, Montana, Nebraska, North Dakota, South Dakota and Wyoming.

The Storm Prediction Center issued a moderate risk of severe weather for June 17, 2010 citing a 10% threat for tornadoes, 45% threat for large hail and 45% threat for damaging wind, initially thinking tornadoes would quickly reform into a straight-line wind event. The moderate risk area extended from around Fargo, North Dakota to Des Moines, Iowa and Omaha, Nebraska including the Twin Cities area, with a slight risk area extending across the Upper Midwest. Surface dew points reached the low 70s °F (low 20s °C) with surface temperatures well into 80s °F (near 30 °C) across Minnesota. Surface-based CAPE values were forecast to reach 2000–3000 J/kg.

The first tornadoes were reported across eastern North Dakota during the mid-afternoon hours where a tornado watch was issued for most of the state  as well as extreme northwestern Minnesota closer to the Manitoba and northwestern Ontario borders where many tornadoes, some strong to violent, touched down late that afternoon. After several tornadoes affected areas near the Grand Forks area and closer to the Canada–US border, the activity eventually shifted into northwestern Minnesota by the late afternoon hours while storms over northern Iowa moved across southern Minnesota near the Interstate 90 corridor producing many tornadoes. Other storms developed over central Minnesota near Interstate 94 but most activity missed the Twin Cities area. The supercells eventually reached the Wisconsin border later that evening and reformed into a squall line, rapidly ending the severe weather outbreak. Isolated tornado reports also occurred across Wisconsin and Iowa. Three people were killed according to KARE-TV including one in Mentor (Polk County), one in Almora (Otter Tail County) and one near Albert Lea (Freeborn County) an area that sustained heavy damage from a possible long-track tornado. Large tornadoes were sighted in Kiester in Faribault County and near Ellendale and Blooming Prairie in Steele County, Minnesota.

The town of Wadena was also hard hit; the high school was heavily damaged by a tornado that prompted a tornado emergency.  Extensive damage was also reported in various other communities in Minnesota as well as in North Dakota from either tornadoes or widespread damaging winds such as in the Rochester, Minnesota area where several buildings, including homes, were heavily damaged on the northern side of the town. A local emergency was declared in Rochester by the mayor following the storms.  The three tornado fatalities in Minnesota were the most for a single outbreak since 1978, and the three EF4 tornadoes were the most on a single day since 1967.

A moderate risk of severe weather was issued for parts of southern Iowa, northern Missouri and northwestern Illinois during the mid-morning of June 18 citing mostly the threat for damaging winds (45%), though a few tornadoes would be possible as CAPE values of 4000 j/kg were forecast across the Missouri and mid-Mississippi Valleys, especially behind the main derecho. Such did not materialize, however.

Confirmed tornadoes

June 16 event

June 17 event

June 18 event

Wadena supercell

Around 3:20 p.m. CDT (2120 UTC), a supercell thunderstorm developed over Stevens County, Minnesota and initially tracked north-northeastward before turning fully northeast. At 4:56 pm CDT (2256 UTC), a tornado warning was issued for portions of Becker, Clearwater, Hubbard, Otter Tail and Wadena Counties. Before crossing the Otter Tail-Wadena County border, the storm's width had reached . The tornado then struck the western side of Wadena, causing widespread severe damage. Two houses were blown away from their foundations and many other houses and businesses were destroyed by this large wedge tornado. Many other structures were damaged to lesser degrees as well. Wadena-Deer Creek High School lost large sections of its roof and suffered extensive damage to its interior. A bus garage and an apartment complex were also damaged and school buses were thrown into the air. Trees were also debarked and snapped throughout the town. Cars were tossed by the tornado and headstones were toppled at a cemetery in Wadena. About 20 people were injured. Damage from the tornado reached $32 million, making it the most destructive of the outbreak.
 In light of the damage in the city, a tornado emergency was declared for Sebeka and Nimrod; however, substantial damage never took place in these areas. Continuing northeastward, the tornado gradually weakened before dissipating at 5:16 pm CDT (2316 UTC), ending its  track. Over the following 18 minutes, this storm made several touchdowns along a  track that continued into Cass County. Damage from this tornado was largely limited to broken tree limbs. Continuing northeast, the supercell eventually dissipated over Cass County around 6:30 pm CDT (2330 UTC).

Canadian Prairies flooding
North of the tornadic supercells, heavy rain affected areas of the southern Canadian Prairies where at least  of rain fell across southern Alberta and Saskatchewan on June 16 – 17 causing widespread flooding. A state of emergency was declared at the Blood Tribe Indian Reserve where people were stranded in homes due to flood waters. Nine municipal governments in Alberta also declared state of emergencies due to the flooding as did some areas of southern Saskatchewan. Portions of the Trans-Canada Highway were closed for  due to flooding along the border between Saskatchewan and Alberta on June 18 and remained shut down until June 26. At times,  of land around the highway was submerged by flood waters. Other roads and bridges were flooded and in some cases washed away. The Cypress Hills Interprovincial Park was also left inaccessible. Agricultural areas sustained considerable losses throughout the region as entire harvests were lost to the floods and much of the growing season had past leaving no time to re-plant crops. Throughout Alberta, losses reached C$69 million ($70.3 million), including C$54 million ($55 million) in Medicine Hat alone. A total of 340 homes were affected by the floods, 11 of which had to be condemned. Additionally,  of the Trans-Canada Highway had been washed out.

Due to the prolonged shut down of the Trans-Canada Highway, many businesses along the road experienced hundreds of thousands of dollars in lost profits. Some stores reported a 95 percent decrease in income, roughly C$4,000 daily. On June 25, some residents in Medicine Hat were given C$3,000 in aid from the Provincial Disaster Assistance Program. In the weeks after the disaster, reconstruction of roadways and bridges washed out by the floods began. Engineers estimated that it would take four to five weeks to repair the Trans-Canada Highway.

June 18 Midwest derechos

Following the prolific tornado outbreak, a mesoscale convective system developed across eastern Nebraska in the Omaha area during the morning hours of June 18. It gradually intensified before moving into the Des Moines area near midday. The bow echo intensified into an intense progressive derecho over eastern Iowa and propagated eastward into northern Illinois and southern Wisconsin that afternoon. Extensive damage was reported from the derecho, including in the Chicago metropolitan area as the derecho reached that region shortly before 4:00 pm CDT (2100 UTC). Nearly 300,000 customers lost power and windows were blown out of high-rise buildings in downtown Chicago.
Some counties utilized warning sirens due to the derecho's extreme winds, despite the fact that there was no formal tornado warning.

The derecho continued eastward, maintaining its strength over southern Lower Michigan and northern Indiana in the early evening hours. Winds as high as 90 mph (150 km/h) were reported in southwest Michigan with widespread damage over the region). The storm knocked out power to nearly 300,000 customers of Commonwealth Edison in the Chicago area. Windows were blown out of several high rises in downtown Chicago, including the tallest building, the Willis Tower. 
 More than 100,000 lost power in the immediate Detroit region including in Oakland and Wayne Counties, over 75,000 in the Grand Rapids/Kalamazoo regions  and over 50,000 in northern Indiana and southwestern Michigan. The derecho finally weakened and rapidly dissipated as it reached Lake Erie.

During the evening hours of June 18, a second, weaker derecho formed over Iowa and began following a path similar to the first one, and by 8:45 pm CDT (0145 UTC) the storm was moving across Illinois causing damage in areas already affected by the initial derecho event before weakening and dissipating. One fatality was reported from the event in northern Indiana and in Dexter, Michigan. This storm also produced dangerous lightning with two homes hit by lightning in Dexter and Scio Township in Michigan.

See also

Tornadoes of 2010

References

Tornadoes of 2010
F4 tornadoes by date
Northern Plains,2010-06-16
Tornadoes in Minnesota
Tornadoes in North Dakota
Tornadoes in South Dakota
Tornadoes in Wisconsin
Tornadoes in Iowa
Northern Plains tornado outbreak
Northern Plains tornado outbreak
Northern Plains tornado outbreak